Kafr 'Aya (also spelled Kfar Aaya or Kafr Aia) is a village in the Homs Governorate in central Syria, just south of Homs. According to the Central Bureau of Statistics (CBS), Kafr 'Aya had a population of 6,918 in 2004. Its inhabitants are predominantly Sunni Muslims.

References

Populated places in Homs District